Evaristo Frisoni (born October 1, 1907 in Brescia) was an Italian professional football player. Frisoni played for 8 seasons (207 games, 21 goals) in the Serie A for both Brescia Calcio and A.S. Roma.

His older brother, Berardo Frisoni, also played football professionally. To distinguish them, Berardo was referred to as Frisoni I and Evaristo as Frisoni II. He is the father of Walter Frisoni.

1907 births
Year of death missing
Italian footballers
Serie A players
Brescia Calcio players
A.S. Roma players
Association football midfielders